John Strelecky (born September 13, 1969) is an American author of motivational books and the creator of the Big Five for Life concept.

As of 2022, Strelecky's books have sold more than nine million copies worldwide and have been translated into 43 languages.

Writing
In 2002, Strelecky wrote his first book, The Cafe on the Edge of the World. The book was initially self-published, but after it had sold more than ten thousand copies across twenty-four countries in less than a year, he was signed by a literary agent.

The book was a best-seller in Singapore, then Taiwan. In 2009, it was released in French Canada under the title Le Why Cafe. In Germany, The Cafe on the Edge of the World, has been a Der Spiegel best-seller in its category since 2015.

Books 
Strelecky has authored the following books:
The Cafe on The Edge of The World 
Return to The Cafe on The Edge of The World 

The Big Five for Life 
The Big Five for Life Continued 
Life Safari 
AHAS! - Moments of Inspired Thought 
How to be Rich and Happy

References

American self-help writers
American spiritual writers
Writers from Florida
Living people
1969 births
Kellogg School of Management alumni